Alan Louis Eggers (November 2, 1895 – October 3, 1968) was a sergeant in the United States Army during World War I. He received the Medal of Honor for his heroic actions in combat near Le Catelet, France, on September 29, 1918, together with John C. Latham and Thomas E. O'Shea. Eggers was a student at Cornell University before departing for service. He was awarded the degree of "War Alumnus" in 1921.

He was buried at Arlington National Cemetery, in Arlington, Virginia.

Medal of Honor citation

Rank and organization: Sergeant, United States Army, Machine Gun Company, 107th Infantry, 27th Division.
Place and date: Near Le Catelet, France, September 29, 1918.
Entered service at: Summit, New Jersey.
Birth: Saranac Lake, New York.
General Orders: War Department, General Orders No. 20 (January 30, 1919).

Citation:
 
Becoming separated from their platoon by a smoke barrage, Sergeant Eggers, Sergeant John C. Latham and Corporal Thomas E. O'Shea took cover in a shell hole well within the enemy's lines. Upon hearing a call for help from an American tank, which had become disabled 30 yards from them, the three soldiers left their shelter and started toward the tank, under heavy fire from German machineguns and trench mortars. In crossing the fire-swept area Corporal O'Shea was mortally wounded, but his companions, undeterred, proceeded to the tank, rescued a wounded officer, and assisted two wounded soldiers to cover in a sap of a nearby trench. Sergeant Eggers and Sergeant Latham then returned to the tank in the face of the violent fire, dismounted a Hotchkiss gun, and took it back to where the wounded men were, keeping off the enemy all day by effective use of the gun and later bringing it, with the wounded men, back to our lines under cover of darkness.

Military awards 
Eggers' military decorations and awards include:

See also

List of Medal of Honor recipients for World War I
Thomas E. O'Shea
John Cridland Latham

References

External links
 

1895 births
1968 deaths
United States Army Medal of Honor recipients
Cornell University alumni
United States Army soldiers
United States Army personnel of World War I
People from Summit, New Jersey
Burials at Arlington National Cemetery
World War I recipients of the Medal of Honor
People from Saranac Lake, New York
Recipients of the Distinguished Conduct Medal